In complex analysis, a branch of mathematics, the Casorati–Weierstrass theorem describes the behaviour of holomorphic functions near their essential singularities. It is named for Karl Theodor Wilhelm Weierstrass and Felice Casorati. In Russian literature it is called Sokhotski's theorem.

Formal statement of the theorem
The Casorati–Weierstrass theorem then states that 

This can also be stated as follows: 

Or in still more descriptive terms:

It is remarkable that this does not hold for holomorphic maps in higher dimensions, as the famous example of Pierre Fatou shows.

Examples
The function  has an essential singularity at 0, but the function  does not (it has a pole at 0).

Consider the function

This function has the following Taylor series about the essential singular point at 0:

Hence it is an isolated singularity, as well as being an essential singularity. 

Using a change of variable to polar coordinates  our function,  becomes:

Taking the absolute value of both sides:

Consider what happens, for example when z takes values on a circle of diameter  tangent to the imaginary axis. Then,

and

Thus, may take any positive value other than zero by the appropriate choice of R. As  on the circle,  with R fixed. So this part of the equation:

takes on all values on the unit circle infinitely often. Hence  takes on the value of every number in the complex plane except for zero infinitely often.

Proof of the theorem
A short proof of the theorem is as follows:

Take as given that function  is meromorphic on some punctured neighborhood , and that  is an essential singularity.

Then the new function:

It can therefore be analytically continued (or continuously extended, or holomorphically extended) to all of V by Riemann's analytic continuation theorem. So the original function can be expressed in terms of :

for all arguments z in V \ {z0}. Consider the two possible cases for

If the limit is 0, then f has a pole at z0 . If the limit is not 0, then z0 is a removable singularity of f . Both possibilities contradict the assumption that the point z0 is an essential singularity of the function f . Hence the assumption is false and the theorem holds.

History
The history of this important theorem is described by Collingwood and Lohwater. It was published by Weierstrass in 1876 (in German) and by Sokhotski in 1868 in his Master thesis (in Russian). So it was called Sokhotski's theorem in the Russian literature and Weierstrass's theorem in the Western literature. The same theorem was published by Casorati in 1868, and by Briot and Bouquet in the first edition of their book (1859).
However, Briot and Bouquet removed this theorem from the second edition (1875).

References

 Section 31, Theorem 2 (pp. 124–125) of 

Theorems in complex analysis
Articles containing proofs